Sante I Bentivoglio (1426–June 24, 1462) was an Italian nobleman who ruled as tyrant or de facto prince of Bologna from 1445 to 1462.

Officially the son of a poor blacksmith, he worked as a youth in the wool industry in Florence under another name, until he was alleged to be a natural son of Ercole Bentivoglio. He was educated at Florence in the court of  Cosimo de' Medici the Elder and possessed a vast culture. Through his putative noble father, Sante can pretend to be a cousin of Annibale I Bentivoglio, at the time ruler of Bologna (also of dubious paternity). When Annibale was killed in an ambuscade by a rival family, the people of Bologna gave him the government of their city with the title of Gonfaloniere di Giustizia. He was also named as sole tutor of Annibale's son, Giovanni. The event transformed Sante from a Florentine popolano into the virtual prince of Bologna. It was with Sante Bentivoglio's seizure of power, encouraged by the Duke of Milan, that the Signoria was ultimately established in Bologna.

In 1454 he married Ginevra Sforza, then fourteen years old, the daughter of Alessandro Sforza, lord of Pesaro, establishing his family's close relationship with the Sforza dynasty. The two had two daughters: Costanza (1458–1491), who married Antonmaria Pico della Mirandola, and Ercola (1459–1505). He also had a son Ercole (1459-1507), who became a condottiero and fought for Florence in several successive wars. In 1457 the Pope and Sante Bentivoglio created a mixed constitutional state in Bologna. In 1460 Sante started building the impressive Palazzo Bentivoglio, which was destroyed in 1507 after the Bentivoglio were ousted from Bologna. He obtained from the pope's autonomy of government over the city and established a communal senate including local nobles and Papal representants. He worked in cooperation with the representatives of the pope: Pius II even visited Bologna two times in 1458 and 1459. It did not trust them however and said on one occasion: "The blood of my own kin has taught me a bitter lesson as to the little faith that can be placed in priests."

Politically, he allied with the Republic of Venice, the House of Sforza and the house of Medici, playing on the Venetian fear of both Milan and Florence. He died in Bologna in 1462 due to illness, being succeeded by Giovanni II Bentivoglio, Annibale's son, who later remarried his widow Ginevra.

The great Bolognese historian Cherubino Ghirardacci wrote that 'Sante Bentivoglio had achieved the highest reputation, not just among the citizens of Bologna, but also among the lords of Italy, which was a marvellous thing'

References

1426 births
1462 deaths
Sante 1